"That's What Friends Are For" is a song written by Burt Bacharach and Carole Bayer Sager.

It was first recorded in 1982 by Rod Stewart for the soundtrack of the film Night Shift, but it is better known for the 1985 cover version by Dionne Warwick, Elton John, Gladys Knight, and Stevie Wonder. This recording, billed as being by "Dionne Warwick & Friends", was released as a charity single for AIDS research and prevention. It was a massive hit, becoming the number-one single of 1986 in the United States, and winning the Grammy Awards for Best Pop Performance by a Duo or Group with Vocals and Song of the Year. It raised more than $3 million for its cause.

Rod Stewart version
That’s What Friends Are For was included on the expanded edition of the 2008 remaster of the album Body Wishes.

Personnel
 Rod Stewart – vocals
 Jim Cregan – guitar, background vocals
 Jimmy "Z" Zavala – saxophone
 Kevin Savigar – keyboards
 Jay Davis – bass
 Tony Brock – drums, background vocals

Dionne Warwick version

Dionne Warwick's of "That's What Friends are For" marked the first time she had worked with Bacharach since the 1970s, when Warwick felt abandoned by Bacharach and Hal David dissolving their partnership. Warwick said of their reconciliation:

A one-off collaboration headed by Warwick and featuring Gladys Knight, Elton John, and Stevie Wonder, with a different second verse, was released as a charity single in the United Kingdom and the United States in 1985. The song is in the key of E major. It was recorded as a benefit for American Foundation for AIDS Research, and raised more than US$3 million for that cause. Warwick, who had previously raised money for blood-related diseases such as sickle-cell anemia, wanted to help combat the then-growing AIDS epidemic because she had seen friends die painfully of the disease. John plays piano and Wonder plays harmonica on the song; the two had previously worked together on 1983's "I Guess That's Why They Call It the Blues".

In the United States, the song held the number-one spot of the adult contemporary chart for two weeks, the number-one spot of the soul chart for three weeks, and the top spot of the Billboard Hot 100 for four weeks and became Billboards number one single of 1986. It was certified Gold on January 15, 1986, by the Recording Industry Association of America (RIAA). It was the final US number one for all but John (John would have two more US number-ones during the 1990s). Due to Wonder's involvement, it also holds the distinction of being the last number-one song for anyone who had topped the charts before the British Invasion (his first number-one hit, "Fingertips", came in 1963).

Outside the United States, the song topped the charts in Canada and Australia and reached the top 10 in Ireland, New Zealand, Norway, South Africa, and Sweden. On the UK Singles Chart, the song debuted at number 49 and climbed to its peak of number 16 three weeks later, staying at that position for another week before descending the chart. It remained in the UK top 100 for a further five weeks, totaling 10 weeks on the chart altogether.

The Dionne and Friends version of the song won the performers the Grammy Award for Best Pop Performance by a Duo or Group with Vocals, as well as Song of the Year for its writers, Bacharach and Bayer Sager. This rendition is also listed at number 75 on Billboard's Greatest Songs of all time.

Warwick, John, Knight, and Wonder performed the song live together for the first time in 23 years at the 25th Anniversary AmfAR Gala in New York City on February 10, 2011.

Personnel
 Dionne Warwick – vocals
 Elton John – vocals, piano
 Gladys Knight – vocals
 Stevie Wonder – vocals, harmonica
 Freddie Washington - bass
 John Robinson - drums
 Carlos Vega - drums
 Michael Landau - guitar
 Randy Kerber - keyboards
 David Foster - synthesizer
 Paulinho da Costa - percussion
Source:

Charts

Weekly charts

Year-end charts

Certifications

1990 benefit concert 
On March 17, 1990, an AIDS benefit titled That's What Friends Are For: Arista Records 15th Anniversary Concert was held at Radio City Music Hall in New York City. One month later, CBS aired a two-hour version of the concert on television. The celebrity guests and Arista label performers were: Air Supply, Lauren Bacall, Burt Bacharach, Eric Carmen, Chevy Chase, Jane Curtin, Clive Davis, Taylor Dayne, Michael Douglas, Exposé, Whoopi Goldberg, Melanie Griffith, Hall & Oates, Jennifer Holliday, Whitney Houston, Alan Jackson, Kenny G, Melissa Manchester, Barry Manilow, Milli Vanilli, Jeffrey Osborne, Carly Simon, Patti Smith, Lisa Stansfield, The Four Tops, and Dionne Warwick. "That's What Friends Are For" was the finale song sung by Warwick and cousin Houston before being joined on the stage by the other guests of the event. More than $2.5 million was raised that night for the Arista Foundation which gave the proceeds to various AIDS organizations.

References 

1980s ballads
1985 singles
1982 songs
1986 singles
All-star recordings
Arista Records singles
Billboard Hot 100 number-one singles
Cashbox number-one singles
Charity singles
Dionne Warwick songs
Elton John songs
Gladys Knight songs
Grammy Award for Song of the Year
Helen Reddy songs
Number-one singles in Australia
Pop ballads
Rod Stewart songs
RPM Top Singles number-one singles
Stevie Wonder songs
Songs about friendship
Songs with music by Burt Bacharach
Songs written by Carole Bayer Sager
Songs written for films
Soul ballads